Tim Parlane (born 28 December 1957) is a New Zealand cricket umpire. Along with Wayne Knights he umpired the final of the 2015–16 Ford Trophy in January 2016.

References

External links
 

1957 births
Living people
New Zealand cricket umpires
People from Auckland